Liu Yi may refer to:

People 
 Liu Yi (footballer, born 1997), Chinese footballer
 Liu Yi (footballer, born 1988)
 Liu Yi (admiral) (刘毅; born 1955), deputy commander of the PLA Navy
 Liu Yi, Marquess of Beixiang (劉懿; died 125 AD), briefly ruled as emperor of the Eastern Han
 Liu Yi, Prince of Liang (劉揖; died 169 BC), Western Han prince of the Liang realm
 Liu Yi (CNTA) (刘毅), former Chairman of China National Tourism Administration
 Liu Yi, Prince of Pingyuan, grandson of Emperor Zhang, and father of Emperor Huan of Han (132–168)
 Liu Yi, military leader, associate of Emperor Wu of Liu Song (363–422)
 Liu Yi (310–316), Prince of Hejian, son of Liu Cong (Han Zhao)
 Liu Yi (b. 310) Prince of Pengchen, son of Liu Cong (Han Zhao)
 Liu Yi (Eastern Han governor) (劉翊), Eastern Han governor of the Henan Commandery
 Liu Yi (Eastern Han writer) (劉毅), Eastern Han Marquis of Pingwang (平望)
 Liu Yi (Chen dynasty) (留異), Chen dynasty general
 Liu Yi (born 1015), author of Formulae to Correct Customs (Zhengsufang)
 Liu Yi (badminton, born 2003), Chinese badminton player
 Liu Yi (badminton, born 1988), Singaporean badminton player

Other uses 
 Six Arts or Liù Yì (六藝), the basis of education in traditional Chinese culture